Roy Miller Page (September 7, 1890 – October 8, 1958) was an American lawyer and politician from New York.

Life
He was born on September 7, 1890, in Fosterdale, Sullivan County, New York. He practiced law in Binghamton. He married Mary (1892–1955).

Page was a member of the New York State Senate (40th D.) from 1937 to 1942, sitting in the 160th, 161st, 162nd and 163rd New York State Legislatures. Then he was Surrogate of Broome County.

On April 19, 1944, he was indicted for grand larceny and was accused of retaining part of the salaries of persons he appointed to offices while being a state senator. He was tried before Supreme Court Justice Ely W. Personius in Kingston, and on July 18, 1944, was acquitted by the jury on all counts.

He died on October 8, 1958, in Roswell Park Memorial Institute in Buffalo, New York; and was buried at the Vestal Hills Memorial Park in Vestal.

Sources

External links
 

1890 births
1958 deaths
Republican Party New York (state) state senators
Politicians from Binghamton, New York
People from Cochecton, New York
New York (state) state court judges
Politicians from Kingston, New York
20th-century American judges
Lawyers from Binghamton, New York
20th-century American politicians
20th-century American lawyers